Terra Invicta is a science fiction grand strategy video game developed by Pavonis Interactive and published by Hooded Horse for Windows that was released into early access in September 2022. 

The game centers around the appearance of hostile aliens on Earth, which drive humanity towards different responses. The player controls a faction in a geopolitical simulation on Earth as they attempt to win the game through achieving their faction's unique victory requirements. Terra Invicta represents the first game that developer Pavonis Interactive has developed independently after their previous modding work with Long War for XCOM: Enemy Unknown. Reception to the early access release has been generally positive.

Gameplay 

In Terra Invicta, the player controls one of seven factions on Earth, each of which have their own unique asymmetric ways to reach victory. The game is split into two largely separated, yet interconnected parts. The first part is a geopolitical simulation on Earth, where the factions fight for influence in Earth's nations through methods ranging from espionage and military actions to research and development and industrialization. The other section of the game is a simulation of humanity's expansion into the Solar System in light of the encroaching alien threat, including the widespread militarization and industrialization of space as each faction vies for resources and control. Transferring resources from Earth to space takes extra resources because of gravity, incentivizing the player to build space infrastructure outside of Earth's atmosphere. Space battles utilize physics that are reminiscent of Kerbal Space Program.

Development 
After developing the Long War mod for XCOM: Enemy Unknown, the volunteers who had worked on the mod were contacted by Firaxis Games and paid to help with development for day-one mods and a Long War 2 mod for XCOM 2, the latter of which they received compensation for from Firaxis. After gaining experience working on both mods, the volunteers came together and formed a company called Long War Studios, which they eventually rebranded as Pavonis Interactive, and announced the development of Terra Invicta, their own grand strategy game. The game began development in 2017. In 2020, Pavonis Interactive launched a Kickstarter campaign to help fund development which quickly met its goal and eventually raised $216k at closing. The game was delayed in late 2021 until a 2022 early access release date.

Reception 
Critical reception to Terra Invicta's early access release has focused on its ambitious and interesting gameplay along with its complicated systems. IGN's Jon Bolding remarked that the gameplay was interesting and fun to play, but criticized the game's obtuse mechanics. PC Gamer's Leana Hafer noted that "the barrier to entry is high" but felt that she was "captivated by how it all comes together and delivers on its sky high promises while telling a compelling story with so many twists and turns." Vice's Renata Price noted in her initial thoughts on the game from playing just the very beginning of it that "it is possibly the densest game I’ve ever played, and I think I'm in love with it."

References 

Early access video games
Grand strategy video games
Indie video games
Kickstarter-funded video games
Science fiction video games
Single-player video games
Video games about alien visitations
Video games about space warfare
Windows games
Alien invasions in video games
Video games set in the 2030s
Video games set in the 2020s
Video games about extraterrestrial life
Fiction about space warfare
Military science fiction video games